HMS Anguilla (K500) was a Colony-class frigate of the United Kingdom in commission from 1943 to 1946 that served during World War II. She originally was ordered by the United States Navy as the Tacoma-class patrol frigate USS Hallowell (PF-72), later renamed USS Machias (PF-72), and was transferred prior to completion.

Construction and acquisition
The ship, originally designated a "patrol gunboat," PG-180, was ordered by the United States Maritime Commission under a United States Navy contract as USS Hallowell. Laid down by the Walsh-Kaiser Company at Providence, Rhode Island, on 1 April 1943, Hallowell was reclassified as a "patrol frigate," PF-72, on 15 April 1943 and renamed USS Machias on 5 May 1943. Intended for transfer to the United Kingdom, the ship was renamed Anguilla by the British on 10 June 1943 and launched on 14 July 1943, sponsored by Mrs. John S. MacDonald.

Service history
Transferred to the United Kingdom under Lend-Lease on 15 October 1943, the ship served in the Royal Navy as HMS Anguilla (K500) on patrol and escort duty until 1946. The following day, Anguilla was forced to sink with gunfire the British frigate , which U-286 had heavily damaged.

Disposal
The United Kingdom returned Anguilla to the United States on 31 May 1946. She was sold to Pro-Industry Products of New York City on 13 June 1947 for scrapping.

References 
Notes

Bibliography
 
 Navsource Online: Frigate Photo Archive HMS Anguilla (K 500) ex-Hallowell ex-PF-72 ex-Machias (PF 72) ex-PG-180

External links
Photo gallery of HMS Anguilla

1943 ships
Ships built in Providence, Rhode Island
Tacoma-class frigates
Colony-class frigates
World War II frigates and destroyer escorts of the United States
World War II frigates of the United Kingdom
Royal Navy ship names